The Zillierbach (until 1558 called the Zilgerbach) is a stream in the Harz mountains of central Germany (Harz district) in the state of Saxony-Anhalt. The stream rises on the western side of the Hohneklippen crags and runs initially southwards, then swings northeast at Drei Annen Hohne. South of  Drei Annen Hohne it picks up the waters of the Wormsgraben, its main tributary. The Zillierbach supplies the Zillierbach Dam near Elbingerode. In front of the settlement of Voigtstieg it is joined by another two smaller brooks. In the Middle Ages the Zillierbach powered the mills between Voigtstieg and Wernigerode. This section of the valley is still called Mühlental (Mill Valley) today. In its lower reaches before its mouth the stream is known as the Flutrenne. The stream discharges into the Holtemme at Wernigerode northwest of the West Gate (Westerntor). It drops through a vertical height of almost  from source to mouth.

Habitat and ecology 

The Zillierbach is home to a range of rare fish species, including the protected brown trout, which features on the coat-of-arms of the town of Wernigerode as well as that of the district of Harz. Besides trout, the stream also supports the minnow, the gudgeon and the loach. To improve the ecological environment of the Zillierbach a project was carried out from 2000 to 2002 by the German Foundation for the Environment, which envisaged five weirs with fish ladders in order to provide enable trout to negotiate the river more easily. The project was a significant factor in the town of Wernigerode being recognised for outstanding work in nature conservation as part of the competition to select the nation's "Conservation Capital" (Bundeshauptstadt Naturschutz).

See also 
 Holtemme
 Zillierbach Dam
 List of rivers of Saxony-Anhalt

References

External links 
 DBU project handout on the Zillierbach Project  (pdf file; 104 kB) 
 Wernigerode Fish and Water Conservation Association  

Rivers of Saxony-Anhalt
Rivers of the Harz
Harz (district)
Rivers of Germany